Mbili (Bambili) and Mbui (Bambui) are dialects of a Grassfields Bantu language spoken in Cameroon.

References

Ngemba languages
Languages of Cameroon